Pădurea may refer to several villages in Romania:

 Pădurea, a village in Meteș Commune, Alba County
 Pădurea, a village in Șăulia Commune, Mureș County